Tomás David Sandoval (born 30 March 1999) is an Argentine professional footballer who plays as a forward for Argentine Primera División side Colón.

Career

Club
Sandoval spent a year with Argentinos Juniors in his youth, prior to joining Colón's system at age 11. He began his senior career with Colón in 2016. His debut for the club arrived on 29 April in a 3–1 Argentine Primera División win against Olimpo at the Estadio Brigadier General Estanislao López, he was substituted on for Nicolás Leguizamón on 74 minutes prior to scoring six minutes later to make it 2–0. After two more appearances in 2016, he scored one goal (versus Atlético de Rafaela) in ten matches in 2016–17.

On 24 August 2021, Sandoval joined Platense on a dry loan until July 2022.

International
Sandoval was selected for the Argentina U20s in July 2017. On 17 July, he scored in a 3–1 friendly victory versus Brown.

Personal life
Tomás is the son of former footballer Gustavo Sandoval.

Career statistics
.

References

External links

1999 births
Living people
Footballers from Santa Fe, Argentina
Argentine footballers
Argentina youth international footballers
Argentina under-20 international footballers
Association football forwards
Argentine Primera División players
Club Atlético Colón footballers
Club Atlético Platense footballers